Gilberto José Keb Baas (born October 21, 1977 in Hunucmá, Yucatán, Mexico) is a Mexican professional boxer in the Light Flyweight division. Gilberto is the former WBC Light Flyweight Champion.

Pro career

WBC Light Flyweight Championship
He fought Omar Niño Romero on November 6, 2010, for the WBC light flyweight title at the Poliforum Zamna in Mérida, Yucatán, Mexico. The bout ended with a controversial majority decision in favor of underdog Keb Baas.

In April 2011, he lost his world title to Adrián Hernández.

See also 
 List of WBC world champions
List of Mexican boxing world champions

References

External links 
 

1977 births
Living people
Boxers from Yucatán (state)
Light-flyweight boxers
Mexican male boxers
World Boxing Council champions
World light-flyweight boxing champions
World boxing champions